Syracuse University Press, founded in 1943, is a university press that is part of Syracuse University. It is a member of the Association of University Presses. Domestic distribution for the press is currently provided by the University of North Carolina Press's Longleaf Services.

History
SUP was formed in August 1943 when president William P. Tolley promised Thomas J. Watson that the university will organize a press to print IBM's Precision Measurements in the Metal Workings Industry. Matthew Lyle Spencer of the School of Journalism became the first chair of the board of directors and Lawrence Siegfried was the first editor.

About

The areas of focus for the Press include Middle East studies, Native American studies, peace and conflict resolution, Irish studies and Jewish studies, New York State, television and popular culture, sports and entertainment. The Press has an international reputation in Irish studies and Middle East studies. In March 2017, SU Press received Humanities Open Book Program award from the National Endowment for the Humanities.

Since October 2020, SU press has produced audiobooks in collaboration with Sound Beat, which is produced at Belfer Audio Laboratory and Archive at Syracuse University Libraries.

See also

 List of English-language book publishing companies
 List of university presses

References

External links

 Blog of Syracuse University Press
 List of SUPress books on JSTOR

Press
 
1943 establishments in New York (state)
Book publishing companies based in New York (state)
Publishing companies established in 1943
University presses of the United States
Visual arts publishing companies